The Quarterly Journal of the Royal Meteorological Society is a peer-reviewed scientific journal of meteorology published eight times per year. It was established in 1871 as Bibliography of Meteorological Literature, obtaining its current name in 1873. It is published by Wiley-Blackwell on behalf of the Royal Meteorological Society.

Abstracting and indexing 
The journal is abstracted and indexed in Current Contents/Physical, Chemical & Earth Sciences and the Science Citation Index. According to the Journal Citation Reports, the journal has a 2021 impact factor of 7.237, ranking it 11th out of 94 journals in the category "Meteorology & Atmospheric Sciences".

References

External links 
 

Wiley-Blackwell academic journals
Publications established in 1871
Meteorology journals
English-language journals
8 times per year journals
Royal Meteorological Society academic journals